Sohi or Sohee (Punjabi: ਸੋਹੀ (Gurmukhi); سوہی (Shahmukhi)) is Sikh surname. It is sub-caste of Jatt clan in Indian Punjab and Pakistani Punjab.

People
 Amarjeet Sohi (born 1964) Indo-Canadian politician
 Dolly Sohi, Indian actress
 Gurpreet Sohi (born 1984) Canadian water polo player
 Litta Soheila Sohi (born 1966) Iranian dressage rider
 Sardar Sohi (born 1949) Punjabi Indian actor
 Naser Al-Sohi (1974–2004) Kuwaiti soccer player

Other uses
 Sohi language, a central Iranian language
 Sōhi (蒼氷), a character from the Clamp manga X

See also